Jimmy Pruett (born March 24, 1952) is an American politician. He is a former Republican member of the Georgia House of Representatives from the 149th District, serving from 2007 to 2021.

References

Living people
Republican Party members of the Georgia House of Representatives
1952 births
Place of birth missing (living people)
21st-century American politicians